Yendorian Tales: The Tyrants of Thaine is a role-playing video game written for DOS in 1997.

Plot
Following on from the story of Yendorian Tales Book I and Yendorian Tales Book I: Chapter 2, the seal on the wizard Paltivar has been broken and his return to the lands of Yendor is imminent. However, as dire as the threat from the great wizard is, the kingdoms in the land of Thaine are on the brink of war themselves and must be pacified if the wizard's threat is to be averted.

History
Yendorian Tales: The Tyrants of Thaine was developed by SW Games and released as shareware by Spectrum Pacific Publishing during 1997.

External links

 Yendorian Tales: The Tyrants of Thaine Downloads

1997 video games
DOS games
DOS-only games
Role-playing video games
Video games developed in Australia